Lauren Elizabeth Hughes is an Australian carcinologist and curator. She specialises in the study of amphipods.

Hughes graduated from the University of New England, Armidale with a PhD in 2007. Her thesis was titled "Biodiversity of Amphipods in the Solitary Islands New South Wales, Australia".

, Hughes is principal curator of invertebrates at the Natural History Museum, London. Prior to this, she worked at the Australian Museum in Sydney.

Hughes and zoologist James K. Lowry have described a number of amphipods in a number of joint papers. 

Her zoological author abbreviation is Hughes. See also :Category:Taxa named by Lauren E. Hughes and this wikidata query.

Publications

References 

Living people
Year of birth missing (living people)
University of New England (Australia) alumni
Australian zoologists